Alidou Barkire (born 1925) is a Nigerien politician and former Minister of Justice.

Alidou was born and educated Niamey, and trained to become a teacher in what is now Mali, after which he briefly served in the colonial army and then taught in French Sudan. In 1962 he became secretary general of national defense and director of national defense in Niger. He was Minister of Justice from 1970 until the 1974 Nigerien coup d'état.

References
 

1925 births
Nigerien politicians
People from Niamey
Possibly living people
Justice ministers of Niger